Asociația Club Sportiv Municipal Politehnica Iași, commonly known as Politehnica Iași or simply Poli Iași, is a Romanian professional football club based in the city of Iași, Iași County, which competes in the Liga II.

The team was formed as ACSMU Politehnica Iași in 2010, as a result of the dissolution of the original FC Politehnica Iași the same year; despite this, the club does not hold the record of the old entity. Between 2011 and 2016, it was rebranded as CSM Studențesc Iași, but returned to the name of Politehnica afterwards. After starting out in the second tier, it made its Liga I debut in the 2012–13 season, and equalled the best result of its predecessor by finishing sixth in the 2017–18 Liga I.

Politehnica Iași plays in white and blue uniforms at the inherited Emil Alexandrescu Stadium, which was built in 1960 and has a capacity of 11,390 persons.

History

Foundation and first years (2010–2014)
The original Politehnica Iași was established in April 1945 and folded in 2010 because of unpaid debts. In August that year, Tricolorul Breaza merged with Navobi Iași and formed ACSMU Politehnica Iași. Playing in the Liga II, the club's objective was to return to the first tier of Romanian football.

Ionuț Popa was appointed manager of the newly founded club and Grigore Sichitiu was elected as executive president.

In the summer of 2011, the club was renamed Clubul Sportiv Municipal Studențesc Iași, or simply CSMS Iași. For the second half of the 2011–12 season ex-Romanian international Florin Prunea was brought in as president. On 2 June 2012, after the 4–2 victory against Farul Constanța. the team gained promotion to Liga I, after two years in the second tier of Romanian football.

On 29 August, Liviu Ciobotariu was appointed head coach. The Moldavian team finished the 2012–13 season in 17th place and were relegated to the second division. Even though there were hopes that they would be accepted for the 2013–14 Liga I season, eventually CS Concordia Chiajna secured the last place in the first league, due to the relegation of FC Rapid București for financial reasons.

For the 2013–14 Liga II season, promising young coach Costel Enache was brought in to head a team that retained the services of its young talent, the likes of Alexandru Crețu, Adrian Avrămia and Andrei Hergheligiu.

Return to the top division (2014–present)

After Marius Lăcătuș replaced Enache as manager, Politehnica finished 1st in the 2013–14 Liga II and were promoted back to Liga I. For the 2014–15 season, the club played for their first time in the Cupa Ligii, defeating ASA Târgu Mureș and advancing to the last-16, where they eliminated former Romanian Cup and Liga I winner CFR Cluj.

The 2015–16 Liga I season was one of the best in the short history of Politehnica Iași and in the football history of Iași. After a great campaign, the team finished 7th and qualified for the 2016–17 UEFA Europa League under the command of Italian coach Nicolò Napoli, with a team that relied on experienced players like: Andrei Cristea, Bojan Golubović, Ionuț Voicu and Branko Grahovac. In the second round of the 2016–17 UEFA Europa League, Politehnica encountered Croatian team Hajduk Split and after a 2–2 draw at Iași, they were defeated at Split 1–2, prematurely leaving the competition.

On 22 July 2016, the club announced that it had changed its name, from CSM Studențesc Iași to CSM Politehnica Iași, a name more closely linked to the Iași football tradition and dissolved FC Politehnica Iași (1945).

In June 2017, president Florin Prunea was let go after five years at the helm of Politehnica Iași. Adrian Ambrosie was subsequently appointed to the position. After a number of major departures, with the likes of Lukács Bőle and Daisuke Sato finishing their contracts, the team went into major reconstruction and signed a number of foreign internationals, like Denis Rusu, Kamer Qaka, Luwagga Kizito and Platini. On 24 February 2018, despite a 0–1 loss to defending champions Viitorul Constanța, Poli Iași became the first team from Moldavia to qualify for the Liga I play-off round since its introduction in 2015. To the delight of manager Flavius Stoican, they went on to finish the league in 6th place, thus equalling the best result of predecessor FC Politehnica Iași.

On 11 July that year, the club announced that it earned the right to use the FC Politehnica Iași logo and name, which was considered to be the first step in the plan of regaining the club's full identity, the next one being the recovery of their record.

Stadium
Politehnica Iași plays its home matches at the Emil Alexandrescu stadium. It is located in the borough of Copou, near the Alexandru Ioan Cuza University, and has a capacity of 11,390 seats.

Support
The biggest ultras groups of Politehnica Iași are Băieții Veseli and Ultras. Both supported FC Politehnica Iași (1945) until dissolution and regard the new team as its successor. They have friendly relationships with Zimbru Chișinău. Settore Ultra used to be another group of ultras but were captured by Oțelul Galați.

Rivalries
Politehnica Iași's main rival is Sporting Vaslui, and matches between these clubs are known as the "Moldovan Derby". The rivalry developed in the 2001–02 Liga III season, when the club from Vaslui was fighting for promotion to the second division together with Poli Iaşi, with the latter winning the championship and earning promotion. The rivalry between the two clubs was, again, fueled by another clash for promotion, this time in the 2003–04 Liga II season, with the whites and blues prevailing yet again. Another recent enemy is Oțelul Galați because of their friendly relations with Dacia Chișinău, as Peluza Nord Iași frequently chants obscenities towards them at nearly every game.  

There is another smaller rivalry with FC Botoșani.

Honours

Domestic

Leagues
Liga II
Winners (2): 2011–12, 2013–14

Players

First-team squad

Out on loan

Club officials

Administrative staff

 Last updated: 18 September 2022
 Source: Board of directors

Technical staff

 Last updated: 18 September 2022
 Source: Technical staff

Notable former players

Romania 
  Narcis Bădic
  Gabriel Bosoi
  Alexandru Ciucur
  Alexandru Crețu
  Andrei Cristea
  Cosmin Frăsinescu
  Andrei Hergheligiu
  Ovidiu Mihalache
  Marius Onofraș
  Ionuț Panțîru
  Clement Pălimaru
  Alexandru Țigănașu
  Ionuț Voicu
Argentina
  Juan Pablo Passaglia

Bosnia and Herzegovina
  Bojan Golubović
  Branko Grahovac
Cape Verde
  Luís Carlos Almada Soares
Costa Rica
  Dylan Flores
Netherlands
  Kevin Luckassen
Serbia
  Milan Mitić
Hungary
  Lukács Bőle

Statistics and records

League history

European Cups history

Notes
 1Q: First qualifying round
 2Q: Second qualifying round
 3Q: Third qualifying round
 PO: Play-off round

European cups all-time statistics

References
Notes

Citations

External links
Official website

Club profile on UEFA's official website
Club profile on LPF's official website 

 
Association football clubs established in 2010
Football clubs in Iași County
Sport in Iași
Liga I clubs
Liga II clubs
University and college association football clubs in Romania
2010 establishments in Romania